John Bray Henwood (born 30 August 1972) is a New Zealand long-distance runner. He competed in the men's 10,000 metres at the 2004 Summer Olympics.

References

External links
 Official website
 

1972 births
Living people
Athletes (track and field) at the 2004 Summer Olympics
New Zealand male long-distance runners
Olympic athletes of New Zealand
Place of birth missing (living people)